Deepender Singh (born 15 June 1994 Bhatpura, Sambhal, India) is a champion Indian  para pistol sport shooter.  His family is subsistence farmers living between he Yamuna and Gangatic plains of western Uttar Pradesh.  He has won many gold and silver medals and set a new para world record at the Para World Cup in Bangkok.

Olympic Journey 
From Tin-Shed Academy to Tokyo Olympics  held in 2021. Just months before the world was coming out the era of COVID-19. But, the sensational para shooter Deepender Singh fired his way into the qualifications of the men's 10m air pistol event. Coach Amit Sheoran hard work at  Aryangateways Sports Foundation for Singh proved itself in Olympics. Unfortunately medal slipped off even after being on top initially in qualification table.

Notable performances 
 Silver Medal in men's 10 m. Air Pistol SH1 at the World Shooting Para Sport World Cup 2018 in Chateau roux, France'.
 Gold medal in men's 10 m. Air Pistol at the 'World Shooting Para Sport World Cup 2017, Bangkok, Thailand.
 Represented Indian team in Para Olympic at Tokyo 2021.

See also
Paralympic Committee of India
National Rifle Association of India (NRAI)
 International Shooting Sports Federation (ISSF)
 Sports Authoruity of India (SAI)

External Links 

 Sports Foundation website
 Uttar Pradesh State Rifle Association (UPSRA)

References

Living people
1994 births
Indian male sport shooters
Paralympic shooters of India
Shooters at the 2020 Summer Paralympics